Collaroy was an electoral district of the Legislative Assembly of the Australian state of New South Wales, created in the 1949 redistribution and first contested at the 1950 state election. The seat was created out of a large area covered by the seats of Hornsby to the north and Manly to the south. It was named after and included the Sydney suburb of Collaroy. It was abolished in 1973 and mostly replaced by Pittwater, with part of it being added to Wakehurst.

Members for Collaroy

Election results

References

Former electoral districts of New South Wales
Constituencies established in 1950
1950 establishments in Australia
Constituencies disestablished in 1973
1973 disestablishments in Australia